The Sprint Cup is a set weights Group 2 Thoroughbred horse race in Hong Kong, run at Sha Tin over 1200 metres in April.

Horses three years old and older are qualified to enter this race.

Winners

See also
 List of Hong Kong horse races

References 
Racing Post:
 Racing Information of Sprint Cup (2011/12)
 The Hong Kong Jockey Club 

Horse races in Hong Kong